Tribulus macrocarpus is a species of flowering plant in the family Zygophyllaceae, which is found to the central north of Western Australia, and southern inland Northern Territory and northern South Australia.

It was first described by George Bentham in 1863 from a specimen collected by Francis Thomas Gregory from Nicol Bay.  An holotype (K000725223) collected by Gregory is held at Kew. The specific epithet, macrocarpus, is derived from two Greek roots/words, macro- ("large", "great") and -carpus, ("-fruit" / "-fruited"), and describes the plant as having large fruits.

Conservation status 
Under West Australian conservation laws it is deemed to be "not threatened".

References

External links 
Tribulus macrocarpus occurrence data from Australasian Virtual Herbarium
Tribulus macrocarpus (images from Flickr)

Plants described in 1863
Flora of Western Australia
macrocarpus
Taxa named by Ferdinand von Mueller